Playlist: The Very Best of Dolly Parton is a compilation album from Dolly Parton released as part of the Legacy Recordings Playlist series. The album features 14 tracks from her years at RCA Nashville ranging from her first #1 country single, 1970's "Joshua" to her 1983 #1 country and pop smash "Islands in the Stream" with Kenny Rogers. Despite Columbia Records and RCA Nashville both being owned by Sony BMG, none of her Columbia Records material is represented here. The CD is packaged in eco-friendly recycled cardboard packaging and in lieu of an actual paper booklet, the disc includes a PDF file with song credits, photos, a biography of Parton and wallpapers.

Critical reception
Playlist: The Very Best of Dolly Parton received three and a half out of five stars from Al Campbell of Allmusic. Campbell wrote that "while most will want a greatest-hits package with other mega-hits […] this is still a decent set."

Track listing

Chart performance
Playlist: The Very Best of Dolly Parton peaked at number 57 on the U.S. Billboard Top Country Albums chart the week of July 26, 2008.

References

2008 compilation albums
Dolly Parton compilation albums
Parton, Dolly